is a Japanese football player.

Club career
Hayakawa was born in Niigata on 12 January 1994. Already being recruited from Albirex Niigata as a youngster, he then joined University of Tsukuba for four years. After graduating from university, he joined Albirex Niigata in 2016. In February, he debuted in the opening match of the 2016 season. However he was diagnosed with leukemia in April. Hayakawa stopped playing and began treatment. He returned as a player in 2019.

National team career
In June 2011, Hayakawa was elected Japan U-17 national team for 2011 U-17 World Cup. He played full time in all 5 matches and scored 3 goals.

Club statistics

References

External links

Profile at Albirex Niigata

1994 births
Living people
University of Tsukuba alumni
Association football people from Niigata Prefecture
Japanese footballers
Japan youth international footballers
J1 League players
Albirex Niigata players
Association football defenders